Gerard Butts (born 19 November 1966) is a former Australian rules footballer who played with Carlton in the Victorian Football League (VFL). After playing three games in two years with the Blues, Butts was delisted and moved to Tasmania to play with North Hobart.

Notes

External links

Gerard Butts's profile at Blueseum

1966 births
Carlton Football Club players
North Albury Football Club players
Australian rules footballers from New South Wales
Living people
North Hobart Football Club players